Malik Harris (born 27 August 1997) is a German singer. He represented Germany in the Eurovision Song Contest 2022 with the song "Rockstars", and finished in last place with 6 points.

Early life 
Harris was born in Landsberg am Lech on 27 August 1997. His father is Ricky Harris, a Germany-based American television presenter and actor from Detroit. At the age of 13, Harris got into music by making covers of songs with his guitar.

Career

2022: Eurovision Song Contest 2022 
Harris took part in the contest Germany 12 Points to become Germany's representative for the Eurovision Song Contest 2022. Harris made it to the final casting round held in Berlin in January 2022 and was announced as one of six finalists on 10 February 2022.

The televised final took place on 4 March 2022. The winner was selected through public voting, including options for landline, SMS and online voting. For the online vote, users were able to vote via the official websites of the nine ARD radio channels between 28 February 2022 and 4 March 2022. Harris won the final by a 23 points margin. At the grand final of Eurovision, he finished in last place with 6 points.

Discography

Albums 
 Anonymous Colonist (2021)

EP 
 Like That Again (2019)

Singles 
 "Say the Name" (2018)
 "Welcome to the Rumble" (2019)
 "Like That Again" (2019)
 "Home" (2019)
 "Crawling" (2020)
 "Faith" (2020)
 "When We've Arrived" (2020)
 "Bangin' on My Drum" (2021)
 "Dance" (2021)
 "Time for Wonder" (2021)
 "Rockstars" (2022)

Guest contributions 
 "Dust" (Cosby featuring Malik Harris) (2018)

References 

1997 births
Eurovision Song Contest entrants for Germany
Eurovision Song Contest entrants of 2022
German male singers
German people of African-American descent
Living people
People from Landsberg am Lech